Somy Ali (born 25 March 1976) is a Pakistani-American actress, writer, filmmaker, model and activist who has worked in Bollywood films. She runs a non-profit organization named No More Tears.

Early life
Somy Ali was born on March 25, 1976, in Karachi in Sindh, Pakistan into a family of wealth and privilege. Her mother Tehmina was an Iraqi and her father Madan was Pakistani. After studying at the Convent of Jesus and Mary, Karachi until age 11, she moved to South Florida in the United States with her mother and brother. During an interview, Ali revealed that she was sexually abused at the ages of 5 and 9 by her household staff while living in Karachi and when she shifted to Florida, she was bullied at school and raped by a neighborhood boy at the age of 14. Her mother was also a victim of domestic violence in Pakistan that she and her brother would have to witness.

After she dropped out of school, lived alone, got hooked on acid, survived beatings by drug addicts, and unsuccessfully convincing her mother, Ali convinced her father to allow her to move to the home of Bollywood, Mumbai in Maharashtra, India, at age 16 due to her inspiration of her teenage crush,  Bollywood actor, Salman Khan. She was involved in modeling projects and also performed in Hindi movies while in Mumbai. She had ten appearances in Bollywood movies between 1991 and 1998, as a leading lady with top Bollywood actors. She was in a relationship with Bollywood superstar Salman Khan for eight years from 1991 to 1999. In December 1999, she returned to South Florida to continue her studies.

Education

When she moved back to Florida, Ali acquired her GED and then  attended Nova Southeastern University in Davie, Florida, where she majored in psychology, and obtained her undergraduate degree in two years. She also became very interested in journalism and decided to attend the University of Miami to obtain a master's degree in broadcast journalism. She later dropped out of graduate school and went on to attend New York Film Academy where she graduated with a degree in film making, direction, screenwriting and editing. Her early projects included short films on abortion, domestic violence, and teenage suicide. She later attended the Connecticut School of Broadcasting in Florida and obtained a certification in broadcast journalism in 2004.

Career
Ali became involved with women's rights issues in South Asia. She works toward publicizing, bringing the plight of rape and domestic violence victims. Ali has written articles about rape victims Shazia Khalid, Sonia Naz and Mukhtaran Mai. "My goal is to help all of these women and make sure that every girl/woman in my country and universally is able to obtain an education and has her basic human rights," says Ali. Revenue from her clothing line, So-Me Designs, is donated to her non-profit organization No More Tears, which was founded in 2006.
In 2011, Ali was honored with the American Heritage Award from the American Immigration Council for her work with No More Tears, The Daily Point of Light Award April 15, 2015, by President George H. W. Bush and The National Domestic Violence Month "A Proclamation" by President Barack Obama for her work with No More Tears.

In 2022, Ali and her non-profit organization No More Tears were featured in the Discovery+ docuseries Fight or Flight.

Filmography
 Krishan Avtaar (1993) as Sonia Sawant
 Anth (1994) as Priya
 Yaar Gaddar (1994) as Shashi
 Teesra Kaun? (1994) as Priyanka 
 Aao Pyaar Karen (1994) as Sonu Rai
 Andolan (1995) as Anita
 Mafia (1996) as Kiran Pawar
 Chupp (1997) as Asha Narang
 Fight or Flight (TV Series) (2022) as Herself

References

External links

1976 births
Living people
Actresses from Karachi
Journalists from Karachi
Pakistani emigrants to the United States
Pakistani female models
Pakistani film actresses
Pakistani journalists
Pakistani people of Iraqi descent
Nova Southeastern University alumni
University of Miami alumni
American film actresses
American journalists
Convent of Jesus and Mary, Karachi alumni
Actresses in Hindi cinema
Pakistani expatriate actresses in India
20th-century Pakistani actresses
20th-century American actresses